"Let This Feeling" is a 1993 song by Dutch TV host, singer and MTV VJ Simone Angel, who also co-wrote it. Produced by Italian Eurodance act Cappella, it became a European hit, peaking at number three in Finland, number 15 in Switzerland and number 17 in Austria. On the Eurochart Hot 100, it reached number 51 in January 1994. Outside Europe, the single was successful in israel, peaking at number eight.

Music video
The music video for "Let This Feeling" was directed by Scottish director Matthew Glamorre. It features Simone dancing in a silver flashing  kaleidoscope thing and flying on a pegasus sculpture. The sculpture was made by English sculptor, performance artist, jewellery-maker, and portraitist Andrew Logan.

Track listing
 7" single, Italy
"Let This Feeling" (Crystal Clear Remix) – 5:38
"Let This Feeling" (Clean Remix) – 6:00
"Let This Feeling" (Mix 3)
"Let This Feeling" (Mix 4)
"Let This Feeling" (X Club Cut) – 5:40
"Let This Feeling" (XX Dub Cut) – 5:00
"Let This Feeling" (Mix 7)

 CD single, Europe
"Let This Feeling" (Radio Mix) – 3:59
"Let This Feeling" (Trance Mix) – 6:07 

 CD maxi, Europe
"Let This Feeling" (Radio Mix) – 3:59
"Let This Feeling" (Crystal Clear Mix) – 5:38
"Let This Feeling" (X Club Cut) – 5:40
"When Love Rules the World" (Radio Mix) – 3:49

Charts

External links
 Discography
 Simone Angel's blog from Belize
 Jaden Foundation

References

 

1993 singles
1993 songs
A&M Records singles
Eurodance songs
Simone Angel songs